Coomandook is a settlement about  east-south-east of Adelaide on Dukes Highway in South Australia.

Coomandook is near the edge of the vast mallee scrub area which stretches from western Victoria across into the south east of South Australia. The most common agricultural industries are sheep, beef cattle rearing and grain growing.

The population of Coomandook was not recorded under that name in the 2006 census, but 134 voters cast their votes in Coomandook during the 2010 election.

References

Towns in South Australia